The Minister for Tourism and Sport was a minister in the Government of New South Wales with responsibilities for the administration and support for all sporting bodies and tourism in the state of New South Wales, Australia.

The most recent Minister for Tourism and Sport was Stuart Ayres, who also served as the Minister for Enterprise, Investment and Trade and the Minister for Western Sydney. The minister was assisted in the management of the portfolio by the Minister for Hospitality and Racing, Kevin Anderson, who also served as the Minister for Lands and Water. Both ministers served in the Perrottet ministry, with effect from 21 December 2021. Ayres resigned on 3 August 2022 and the portfolio was split into Sport and Tourism.

List of ministers
The following individuals have served as minister where they have held portfolios that included both tourism and sport:

Related ministerial titles

Tourism

Sport

See also 

List of New South Wales government agencies

Notes

References

External links 
New South Wales Office of Sport – Sport and Recreation

Tourism and Sport
Tourism in New South Wales
Sport in New South Wales